The men's team pursuit was one of seven track cycling events on the Cycling at the 1908 Summer Olympics programme. It was the first appearance of a pursuit-style event. Each nation could enter 1 team of 4 cyclists.

Competition format

In the team pursuit competition, teams started at opposite sides of the track. Each team raced three laps of the track, comprising 1980 yards (1810.5 m). The third cyclist in each four-man team to finish set the time for the team. The competition consisted of three rounds (heats, semifinals, and a final); in each round, 2 teams would compete in each heat. The winner of each heat would advance. The bronze medal was awarded based on the time of the two semifinal losers rather than a direct competition.

Results

First round

Heat 1

Heat 2

Heat 3

The Dutch team had a bye in the first round.

Heat 4

In the only contested heat in the first round, the German team eliminated the French.

Semifinals

Semifinal 1

The Canadians received third place overall as the faster of the two semifinal losers, while the British team moved on to the final.

Semifinal 2

Final

Notes

Sources
 
 De Wael, Herman. Herman's Full Olympians: "Cycling 1908". Accessed 7 April 2006.

Men's team pursuit
Cycling at the Summer Olympics – Men's team pursuit
Track cycling at the 1908 Summer Olympics